RFPIO (RFPIO, Inc.) is a privately owned developer of cloud-based software that automates and streamlines the process of responding to a request for proposal (RFP) based in Beaverton, Oregon. The company also maintains an office in Coimbatore, India. Founded in 2015, the company has expanded rapidly and now has more than 150,000 users worldwide after tripling its user base in 2019 and sustaining growth during the global pandemic. RFPIO software has supported more than $20 billion in RFP responses.

History 

The company was founded in 2015 by Ganesh Shankar, AJ Sunder, and Sankar Lagudu to streamline RFP processes for mid-to-large enterprises. RFPIO was formed in response to the problems Shankar and his colleagues experienced gathering information and compiling responses for RFPs and being unable to find a suitable automation solution. By developing a cloud-based proposal management system, Shankar aimed to simplify and automate the RFP process and make it easier for cross-functional teams to collaborate.

The company experienced rapid growth from the outset and reported having 50 employees in Oregon and India at the end of 2018.

On 2 October 2018, the company obtained its first patent involving the conversion and presentation of proposal documents in a user-friendly format. 

In February 2019, Express Scripts selected the RFPIO response management platform as part of a long-term business transformation initiative. RFPIO reported over 250% growth and more than 125 employees by the end of 2019.

In January 2020, RFPIO expanded its executive team with the additions of Angela Earl, vice president of global marketing and Mohan Natraj, vice president of customer success. Konnor Martin was also promoted to regional vice president of sales for North America. In July 2020, the company reported a 150% increase in usage of RFPIO services, continuing the firm’s growth despite the COVID-19 pandemic.

In April 2021, Microsoft reported saving an estimated $2.4M with RFPIO's Response Management Software. 18 months after implementation, the Microsoft team gave nearly 7,000 users access to 36,200 ready-to-go RFx responses from RFPIO's AI-enabled Answer Library, translating into 12,000 total hours saved.

In August 2021, RFPIO acquired RFP360, a Kansas-based RFP software competitor, bringing RFPIO's employee count to 300.

Financing 

RFPIO’s first round of funding was secured in 2016 through Portland-based investment firm Elevate Capital and from the angel investment group TiE Oregon. In October 2016, RFPIO received $100,000 at the Bend Venture Conference for the company’s performance in the Growth Stage competition. In December 2016, Stephen Marsh, founder of Smarsh, whose company was an early customer of RFPIO, invested $500,000 in the company through his investment vehicle Archivist Capital.
 
In July 2018, the company secured a $25 million funding round from private equity firm K1 Investment Management to accelerate growth and cashed out some of its early investors. This resulted in an early exit for Elevate Capital and produced significant returns.

Services 
RFPIO’s cloud-based software incorporates artificial intelligence, project management and collaboration capabilities and integrates with common sales management applications to help companies respond to RFPs. The platform also allows salespeople to create personalized, proactive selling documents  and has built in e-signature functionality. Companies using RFPIO include ADP, Adobe, Britannica Digital Learning, Broadcom,  DTI Global, Express Scripts, Google Cloud, Facebook, LinkedIn, Microsoft, Salesforce, Smarsh, Zoom and others from across multiple industry segments

Awards and recognition 

In 2020, RFPIO was ranked 14th in a list of the top 100 software products for 2020 out of the more than 57,000 software companies listed on G2 Crowd, a crowd-sourced software review service. The company also received a Silver Stevie Award for Customer Service Department of the year, was named a top 10 tech startup in Oregon by The Tech Tribune, and listed 7th on a list of fastest-growing companies in Portland, Ore. by Growjo. The company received the award for Best Project Management Cloud Service in the 2019-20 Cloud Awards. CEO Ganesh Shankar won the EY Entrepreneur Of The Year 2020 Pacific Northwest Region Award and was listed 5th in Comparably’s list of top CEOs for diversity. RFPIO was also named to Comparably lists for Top 50 Best Companies for Work-Life Balance, Top 50 Happiest Employees, and Top 50 Best Perks & Benefits.
In August 2022 RFPIO's HR Shipra Kamra was featured on the Front cover of the Portland Business Journal and Was also featured on Women's We Admire list of Top 50 Women  Leaders of Oregon.

See also 
 List of companies based in Oregon

References 

Software companies established in 2015
Privately held companies based in Oregon
2015 establishments in Oregon
Companies based in Beaverton, Oregon
American companies established in 2015